Shawn Brent Christian (born 14 September 1975) is a Pitcairnese politician, who served as Mayor of the Pitcairn Islands between 2014 and 2019. He previously served in prison after being convicted of child rape.

Biography
Christian was born to Steve Christian and Olive Jal Brown, and was named after Shawn Branigan, the son of friends of his parents. He is a patrilineal descendant of Fletcher Christian. In 1998 he moved to Australia and studied in Newcastle, New South Wales.

Along with his father, who was then serving as the islands' mayor, and older brother Randall, he was implicated in the Pitcairn sexual assault trial in 2004, and after being extradited from New Zealand to stand trial, was found guilty of two counts of child rape and one count of aiding or abetting a rape. One of the charges related to an incident in which he and his brother gang raped a 12-year-old girl. He was sentenced to three-and-a-half years in prison, but was released after two years.

In the 2013 elections, Christian was elected Mayor of the Pitcairn Islands, beating Simon Young in the third round of voting with a majority of just under 3%, after no candidate received an absolute majority in the first round and the second round (runoff) resulted in a tie. He was re-elected in the 2016 elections for another three-year term.

References

Living people
1975 births
Mayors of the Pitcairn Islands
People convicted of child sexual abuse
Pitcairn Islands people convicted of rape
Politicians convicted of sex offences
Pitcairn Islands Seventh-day Adventists
Members of the Island Council of the Pitcairn Islands